Henk-Jan Zwolle (born 30 November 1964 in Enschede, Overijssel) is a former rower from the Netherlands and two-time Olympic medallist. He competed in three consecutive Summer Olympics, starting in 1988.

Zwolle and Nico Rienks won gold in double sculls at the 1991 World Rowing Championships in Vienna. The following year, they won a bronze medal in the men's double sculls at the 1992 Summer Olympics. At the 1996 Summer Olympics, he claimed the gold medal in the men's eight event with the Holland Acht (Holland Eight).

He married fellow Dutch rower Tessa Appeldoorn in October 1998.

References

1964 births
Living people
Dutch male rowers
Rowers at the 1988 Summer Olympics
Rowers at the 1992 Summer Olympics
Rowers at the 1996 Summer Olympics
Olympic rowers of the Netherlands
Olympic gold medalists for the Netherlands
Olympic bronze medalists for the Netherlands
Sportspeople from Enschede
Olympic medalists in rowing
Medalists at the 1996 Summer Olympics
Medalists at the 1992 Summer Olympics
World Rowing Championships medalists for the Netherlands